John Robins (c. 1714 – 17 December 1754) was an English politician.

Life
Robins was the eldest son of William Robins, Mayor of Stafford and Catherine Abnett, daughter of William Abnett, also a mayor of Stafford. In 1752, he was involved in a scandal after impregnating Anne Northey and abandoning her. She swiftly married Sir William Wolseley, 5th Baronet, but Robins then proposed, and persuaded the clergyman to 'prove' that their marriage had occurred earlier, and that her marriage to the baronet was invalid. After the court found against him, he fled to France and died. Anne remarried.

Career
Robins was a Member of Parliament for Stafford in 1747–1754.

References

1714 births
1754 deaths
People from Stafford
British MPs 1747–1754
Members of the Parliament of Great Britain for Stafford